Kehila is a village in Saaremaa Parish, Saare County, on the western part of Saaremaa Island, Estonia.

Before the administrative reform in 2017, the village was in Kihelkonna Parish.

References

Villages in Saare County